Mossville may refer to a place in the United States:

Mossville, Arkansas
Mossville, Illinois
Mossville, Louisiana
Mossville, Pennsylvania